Semini Dinusha Palihawadana née Iddamalgoda (born June 19, 1973 as සේමිණි ඉද්දමල්ගොඩ) [Sinhala]), popularly as Semini Iddamalgoda, is an actress in Sri Lankan cinema, theater and television. Performing in both dramas to comedies, she is best known for the role Roshini in television sitcom Yes Boss, role Kumari in the film  Sinhawa Atharin and as Suddi in film 28.

She participated for reality programs Sirasa Dancing Stars and then for Hiru Mega Stars

Personal life
Semini Iddamalgoda was born on 19 June 1973 in Colombo as the eldest of the family for K.M.P. Bandara and Nesta Palihawadana. She has a younger brother, Gihan Menaka. She started education from Niyagama Primary School, Elpitiya.

She is married to Dhammika Jayalal Keerthi Iddamalgoda, who is a Police officer. He was born on April 27, 1967 as the youngest of three siblings. His father, Weerasiri Kularatne Iddamalgoda was a Co-operative Inspector and Internal Auditor, and his mother was Fransisca Jayawardane of Weralupa, Ratnapura. Dhammika studied at Sivali Central College, Ratnapura. He joined the Police in 1988 at the age of 21. Just after finishing A/L for Semini, they married on 15 December 1994 and the couple has one daughter, Kumali Aseka born on 2001.

Acting career
In 2001, she is invited to act in the teledrama Irabatu Tharuwa by Sriyani Amarasena. She acted in the stage drama Punchi Adara Balakirima and won the award for the best actress in state drama festival. Hansa Geethaya directed by V. Sivadasan became her first teledrama production.

Selected television serials

 Abhisamaya
 Amuthu Minissu
 Dedunu Sihina
 Dekona Gini 
 Dewana Maw 
 Gimhana Tharanaya 
 Gini Pupuru
 Irabatu Tharuwa as Punni
 Kadupul Mal
 Kammiththa
 Karuwala Gedara as Podi Hami 
 Kinduru Adaviya
 Kiripabalu Vila 
 Kuwera Wara 
 Maada Nubamaya
 Maya Agni
 Netra Mangalyaya
 Nim Walalla 
 Nonimi Yathra 
 Pawara Menuwara
 Randoli
 Rangana Vijithaya 
 Ran Mehesi 
 Samanala Yaya 
 Sathya
 Swayanjatha
 Tharupaba
 Ukusso
 Visirunu Renu
 Wara Mal
 Yakada Pahanthira
 Yasa Isuru 
 Yes Boss as Roshini

Selected stage dramas

 Punchi Adara Balakirima

Beyond acting
She was the Second-Runner-Up of the Mrs. Sri Lanka pageant in 1999. In 2006, she hosted the television program Semini Samaga Mathaka Mawatha telecast on TV Derana.

Controversy
In 2013, Iddamalgoda sued fellow actress Damitha Abeyratne for Rs 50 million having allegedly defamed her during an interview with a Ran FM radio channel on January 13, 2013. In 2014, Abeyratne demanded Rs. 100 million as damages from Iddamalgoda for allegedly defaming her. The case was taken at the Colombo District Court on 24 February 2014. On 14 October 2014, both withdrew their civil suits.

Filmography
Her maiden cinematic experience came through a supportive role in 2001 film Rosa Wasanthe, directed by Udayakantha Warnasuriya. Some of her popular films are Sudu Hansi, 28 and Sinahawa Atharin.

Awards and accolades
She has won several awards at the local stage drama festivals and television festivals.

Sumathi Awards

|-
|| 2001 ||| Irabatu Tharuwa || Best Upcoming Actress || 
|-
|| 2012 ||| Ithin Mata Awasarai || Merit Award ||

Sarasaviya Awards

|-
|| 2001 ||| Yakada Pihatu || Merit Award ||

State Drama Festival Awards

|-
|| ||| Punchi Adara Balakirima || Best Actress ||

Presidential Film Awards

|-
|| 2015 ||| Sinahawa Atharin || Best Actress ||

References

External links
 I get closer to Sanath - Semini Iddamalgoda
 This week's love talk is with popular actoress Semini Iddamalgoda
 And they came for Vidhya : Who and what is next?
 Chat with Semini about Love
 Sudu Hansi-ROLE SWITCHING
 කාවවත් ඇඟේ දාගෙන කරේ දාගෙන ආශ්‍රය කිරීමක් මගේ නෑ - Semini Iddamalgoda
 ඉවසලා ඉවසලා මගේ දැන් රතු කට්ට පැනලා
 විවිධ මානසික මට්‌ටම්වල පුද්ගලයන් හදුනගන්න ලැබුණා – ගෙදර පරිසරය ශක්‌තිමත් නිසා ඔරොත්තු දෙන්න පුළුවන් වුණා
 මුල අමතක වීම ජානවලින් එන දෙයක්‌ - Semini Iddamalgoda
 මගේ ලස්සන - Semini Iddamalgoda
 මළ මිණියකට නිරුවත් වුණු සේමිණි ඉද්දමල්ගොඩ
 මම අවශ්‍ය තැන් වලට ඇදුම් ඇදලයි හිටියේ
 මේ අවමානය මකා ගන්නේ කෙළෙසද? සේමිණි අවධාරණයෙන් අසයි
 මේ චිත්‍රපටයේ කිසිම කුණුහරුපයක් නැහැ - සේමිණි ඉද්දමල්ගොඩ

Living people
Sri Lankan film actresses
1973 births